Magadania may refer to:
 Magadania (brachiopod), a fossil genus of brachiopods in the family Monticuliferidae
 Magadania (plant), a genus of plants in the family Apiaceae
 Magadania, a genus of fishes in the family Zoarcidae, synonym of Magadanichthys